John Griffin may refer to:

Lawyers
John Griffin (judge) (1774/1779 – after 1823), American jurist and member of the Michigan Territorial Supreme Court, 1806–1823
John Bowes Griffin (1903–1992), British lawyer, Chief Justice of Uganda and first Speaker of the Ugandan Parliament

Politicians
John Griffin (Allegany County, New York) (c. 1771–1846), New York politician
John Griffin (MP) (fl. 1414), English politician
John Gardner Griffin (1815–?), Wisconsin and Connecticut politician
John K. Griffin (1789–1841), U.S. Congressman from South Carolina, 1831–1841
John Strother Griffin (1816–1898), American surgeon and politician in Los Angeles
John W. Griffin (politician) (1927–2006), American local political figure in Ohio

Sports personalities
John Griffin (alpine skier) (1930–2005), Canadian alpine skier
John Griffin (baseball) (1913–1984), American baseball player
John Griffin (basketball) (born 1956), American college basketball player and coach
John Griffin (defensive back) (born 1939), American football defensive back
John Griffin (hurler) (born 1984), Irish hurler with the Kerry hurling team
John Griffin (rugby league), New Zealand rugby player
John Griffin (rugby union) (1859–1895), English doctor who played international rugby for Wales
John Griffin (running back) (born 1988), American football player
John-Ford Griffin (born 1979), American Major League Baseball outfielder
Corn Griffin (John Charles Griffin, 1911–1973), American boxer

Others
John Griffin, 4th Baron Howard de Walden (1719–1797), English nobleman and army officer
John Howard Griffin (1920–1980), American journalist and novelist
John Joseph Griffin (1802–1877), English chemist and publisher
John Smith Griffin (1807–1899), American missionary in Oregon Country
John W. Griffin (archaeologist) (1919–1993), American historian in Florida
Johnny Griffin (1928–2008), American bop and hard bop tenor saxophonist
John Griffin (businessman) (born 1942), British businessman and philanthropist
John H. Griffin (1914–1988), Deputy Supreme Knight of the Knights of Columbus

See also
John Colahan Griffin Nature Reserve, Victoria, Australia
John Griffin Carlisle (1834–1910), American congressman from Kentucky
Jonathon Griffin (born 1986), Australian aboriginal footballer
Griffin (The Invisible Man), Jack Griffin, fictional character